Garry Phillips (born 20 July 1968) is a former Australian rules footballer who played for Geelong in the Australian Football League (AFL) in 1990. He was recruited from the Old Haileyburians Football Club in the (Victorian Amateur Football Association (VAFA) with the 48th selection in the 1989 VFL Pre-season Draft.  He was delisted and redrafted again by Geelong with the 26th selection in the 1992 AFL Pre-season Draft.  He is the son of Ken Phillips who played for South Melbourne in the 1960s.

References

External links

Living people
1968 births
Geelong Football Club players
Australian rules footballers from Victoria (Australia)
Old Haileyburians Amateur Football Club players